The men's doubles tennis event was part of the tennis programme and took place between October 7 and 11, at the Geumjeong Tennis Stadium.

Schedule
All times are Korea Standard Time (UTC+09:00)

Results

Final

Top half

Bottom half

References 

2002 Asian Games Official Report, Page 737
Draw

External links 
Official Website

Tennis at the 2002 Asian Games